Triigi is a village in Kose Parish, Harju County in northern Estonia.

It's the location of Kõue Manor (Triigi Manor; Kau).

References

 

Villages in Harju County
Kreis Harrien